Huldahl is a surname. Notable people with the surname include:
 Jeppe Huldahl (born 1982), Danish golfer
 Martin Huldahl (born 2004), Danish footballer

Danish-language surnames